Julius Christoph Ehregott Schaxel (March 24, 1887 – July 15, 1943) was a German biologist who was a native of Augsburg.

He initially studied biology, philosophy and psychology at Jena under Ernst Haeckel (1834–1919), then continued his education in Munich with Richard Hertwig (1850–1937). In 1909 he obtained his PhD at the University of Jena under Ludwig Plate (1862–1937), where from 1918 until 1933, he worked as an associate professor of zoology. During the rise of National Socialism, partly because of his Marxist views and partly owing to his wife's Jewish heritage, he was dismissed from his position at Jena, and in 1933 emigrated to Switzerland, then relocating to Leningrad in the USSR, where he received a position at the Severtsov Evolution and Morphology Institute of the Soviet Academy of Sciences. In 1934 he moved with the institute to Moscow.

Schaxel specialized in the fields of developmental biology and theoretical biology. He is remembered for his research involving limb regeneration and parabiosis of the Mexican axolotl (Ambystoma mexicanum). He practiced biology from a Marxist philosophic standpoint, and was co-founder and editor of the journal Urania (1924 to 1933). In its time, it was a popular magazine known for scientific articles within the framework of Marxist philosophy.

References 

 Julius Schaxel and the end of the Evo–Devo agenda in Jena
  Axolotl News, Issue number 29- Fall, 2001
 Parts of this article are based on a translation of an article from the German Wikipedia.

20th-century German zoologists
1887 births
1943 deaths
Scientists from Augsburg
Academic staff of the University of Jena
Jewish emigrants from Nazi Germany to Switzerland